Nektarios Kotopoulos (born 12 September 2002) is a Greek professional footballer who plays as a forward.

References

2002 births
Living people
Greek footballers
Greece youth international footballers
Super League Greece players
Super League Greece 2 players
Xanthi F.C. players
Association football forwards
Footballers from Xanthi